Nancy Acora is a Ugandan politician and legislator. She represents the people of Lamwo district as woman MP in the parliament of Uganda.

Background 
Acora is an independent member of parliament, she entered parliament after defeating the former member of parliament Molly Lanyero of the National Resistance Movement party.

After the elections, Lanyero was discontented and lodged an election petition against Acora. Acora at the end of the process won the election petition in September 2021.

Career 
In the parliament of Uganda, Acora serves as a member of the presidential affairs committee.

References 

Women members of the Parliament of Uganda
Members of the Parliament of Uganda
21st-century Ugandan women politicians
21st-century Ugandan politicians
National Resistance Movement politicians
Year of birth missing (living people)
Living people